Jean Baptiste Dieussart, also Jean Baptista Dusart (c. 1630 – after c. 1683) was a Flemish sculptor who worked in the Dutch Republic and mainly in Sweden. He mainly created lead statues of which only a few have survived to modern times.

Life and work

Dieussart may have been born in Rome (around 1630) and was the brother of the architect and sculptor Charles Philippe Dieussart. He first appears around 1664 in Stockholm (possibly coming from Germany), when he entered service with count Magnus Gabriel De la Gardie, the Lord High Chancellor of Sweden, who was his main employer and patron until around 1668. Coming to Sweden, he was accompanied by his wife (who died in Stockholm in 1668) and his stepchildren, including Abraham-César Lamoureux and his brother Claude, who were both sculptors, as well as their sister Magdalena, who later married the sculptor Johann Gustav Stockenberg.

While Dieussart was a Baroque sculptor and one of the first representatives a free-standing style of sculpture in Sweden (some consider him Sweden's first modern sculptor), his work has been described as examples of a renaissance-like pseudo-classicism. His work consists mainly of statues, for which he used different materials, although the majority of his known works were made from lead or gilded lead. Possibly due to metal fatigue caused by the softness of the material, however, few of Dieussart's works survive.

For Läckö Castle he is known to have created busts of various members of the De la Gardie family and is also believed to be the creator of two full sized statues of Magnus Gabriel De la Gardie and his father Jakob (originally created for Karlberg Palace, where Dieussart also created decorative sculptures for the palace gardens) that were later moved there.

To decorate another palace owned by the De la Gardie family, namely Makalös palace, Dieussart created several lead statues, including a lead replica of a classical Diana statue. Probably assisted by his stepsons he created several sculptures to decorate the gardens and fountains of Jakobsdal (now Ulriksdal) Palace.

His stepson Abraham-César replaced him as sculptor in De la Gardie's service between 1671 and 1672 and Dieussart is believed to have stayed in Sweden until around 1672, probably employed in his stepson's workshop, but then may have moved back to the Netherlands, appearing again in Swedish records in 1677, and returning to the Swedish mainland around 1679, probably returning to De la Gardie's service. What became of him after 1680 is unknown, as are the date and place of his death.

Most important works

 Lead statues "Amor Dei" and "Amor Patriae" on the roof of the Riddarhuset.

 Garden sculpture group "Perseus and Andromeda" in the park of Jakobsdal Palace (no longer existing).

Attributed works
 Lead statues of Magnus Gabriel and Jakob De la Gardie, originally made for Karlberg Palace, then moved to Läckö Castle, but later relocated to the De la Gardie family mausoleum in Varnhem Abbey.

Literature

Notes

References

1630s births
17th-century sculptors
Swedish sculptors
Flemish Baroque sculptors
Year of death unknown